Joan Geelvinck may refer to:
 Joan Geelvinck (1644–1707), Dutch merchant and politician
 Joan Geelvinck (1737–1802), his great-grandson, mayor of Amsterdam

See also
 Geelvinck